Riad Reda Al Solh (17 August 1894 – 17 July 1951) was the first prime minister of Lebanon after the country's independence. Solh was one of the most important figures in Lebanon's struggle for independence, who was able to unite the various religious groups. He is considered one of the founders of Lebanon.

Early life 

Riad Al Solh, also written Riad el Solh or Riad Solh, was born in Sidon, south Lebanon and of Egyptian origin, on 17 August 1894. His father, Reda Al Solh, was Vice-governor in Nabatiyyah and in Sidon and a leading nationalist Arab leader. In 1915 Reda Al Solh was tried by Ottoman forces and went into exile in Smyrna, Ottoman Empire. He also served as Minister of the Interior in Emir Faisal's government in Damascus.

Riad Al Solh studied law and political science at the University of Paris. He spent most of his youth in Istanbul, as his father was a deputy in the Ottoman Parliament.

Career 

Solh served as prime minister of Lebanon twice. His first term was just after the Lebanon's independence (25 September 1943 – 10 January 1945). Solh was chosen by president Bishara Al Khouri to be his first Prime Minister. Solh and Khouri achieved and implemented the National Pact (al Mithaq al Watani) in November 1943 that provided an official framework to accommodate the confessional differences in Lebanon. The National Pact was an unwritten gentleman's agreement. The Pact stated that president, prime minister and Speaker of the Parliament in Lebanon should be allocated to three major confessional groups based on the 1932 census, namely the Maronite Christians, the Sunni Muslims and the Shiite Muslims, respectively. During his first term, Solh also served as the Minister of Finance from September 1943 to July 1944, and the minister of supplies and reserves from 3 July 1944 to 9 January 1945.

Solh held premiership again from 14 December 1946 to 14 February 1951 again under the presidency of Bishara Al Khouri. Solh was critical of King Abdullah and played a significant role in granting the blessing of the Arab League's political committee to the All-Palestine Government during his second term.

Assassination 
Solh escaped unhurt from an assassination attempt in March 1950. It was perpetrated by a member of the Syrian Social Nationalist Party.

However, several months after leaving office, he was gunned down on 17 July 1951 at Marka Airport in Amman by members of the Syrian Social Nationalist Party. The attack was perpetrated by three gunmen, who killed him in revenge for the execution of Anton Saadeh, one of the party's founding leaders.

Personal life 
He secretly converted to Shia Islam since, compared to Sunni Islam, its inheritance laws meant that his daughters, his only children, could inherit a greater share of his wealth.

Al Solh was married to Fayza Al Jabiri, the sister of two-time prime minister of Syria, Saadallah al-Jabiri. They had five daughters and a son, Reda, who died in infancy. His eldest daughter, Aliya (1935–2007), continued in her father's path in the struggle for a free and secure Lebanon. Aliya propagated the rich cultural heritage of Lebanon abroad until her death in Paris.

Lamia Al Solh (born 1937) was married to the late Prince Moulay Abdallah of Morocco, King Mohammed VI's uncle. Her children are Moulay Hicham, Moulay Ismail and a daughter Lalla Zineb.

Mona Al Solh was formerly married to the Saudi Prince Talal bin Abdulaziz. She is the mother of the Prince Al Waleed bin Talal, Prince Khalid bin Talal and Princess Reema bint Talal.

Bahija Al Solh Assad is married to Said Al Assad who is the former Lebanese ambassador to Switzerland and a former member of parliament. They have two sons and two daughters.

His youngest daughter, Leila Al Solh Hamade, was appointed as one of the first two female ministers in Omar Karami's government.

Legacy 
Patrick Seale's book The Struggle for Arab Independence (2011) deals with the history of the Middle East from the final years of the Ottoman Empire up to the 1950s and focuses on the influential career and personality of Solh. A square in downtown Beirut, Riad al-Solh Square, is named after him.

See also 
 List of assassinated Lebanese politicians

References 

1894 births
1951 deaths
Riad
Prime Ministers of Lebanon
Finance ministers of Lebanon
People from Sidon
Assassinated Lebanese politicians
People murdered in Jordan
Lebanese people murdered abroad
Lebanese people from the Ottoman Empire
1950s murders in Jordan
1951 crimes in Jordan
1951 murders in Asia
Converts to Shia Islam from Sunni Islam
University of Paris alumni
Lebanese independence activists
Assassinated heads of government